Thara is the debut self-titled album by American R&B singer Thara, released in 2007. The album features collaborations with Fatman Scoop, John Legend and Jay Sean.

Background
In the album, with Jeremy Skaller as the producer, Thara worked with Fabolous, John Legend, Kanye West, Rodney Jerkins, and The Neptunes among others. The album features the hit, Jump On, with Fatman Scoop, and a duet which Thara co-wrote with John Legend, Maybe.

Following the release of the album, Thara toured throughout Australia, the UK, and Germany.

Track listing

References

2007 debut albums